During the 1991–92 English football season, Charlton Athletic F.C. competed in the Football League Second Division.

Season summary
In the 1991–92 season, Charlton started the campaign brilliantly and by 23 October, the Addicks were level on points with Middlesbrough at the top of the table after 7 wins in their last 9 league games which included 5 consecutive victories, but their form afterwards took a dip and with only 2 wins from their next 13 league matches, saw them slip to 10th place despite being only 5 points from the play-off positions. They also went on a 10-game unbeaten run towards the end of the season and by 25 April, Charlton sat in the final play-off position and it seemed the Addicks were going to finish in the play-offs but defeats in their final 2 league games against Tranmere and Bristol Rovers, saw eventual play-off winners Blackburn pip them to the final play-off place.

Final league table

Results
Charlton Athletic's score comes first

Legend

Football League Second Division

FA Cup

League Cup

Full Members Cup

Squad

References

Charlton Athletic F.C. seasons
Charlton Athletic